Can You Teach My Alligator Manners? is an interactive children's animated series that previously aired on Disney Channel (part of Playhouse Disney block). The series premiered on June 21, 2008, until November 14, 2009.

Synopsis
A young boy named Mikey has a pet alligator named Al, and Mikey's mother says Mikey can't keep Al unless Al learns manners. Mikey enlists the help of the audience to teach Al manners in a variety of places and situations.

Voice cast
 Colin Ford (US) and Corey Bearman-Worthington (UK) as Mikey Goldman
 Rob Paulsen as Al the alligator

Episodes

Season 1 (2008)
 Playground Manners (June 21, 2008)
 Good Sport Gator (June 28, 2008)
 Nana's Visit (July 5, 2008)
 Restaurant Manners (July 12, 2008)
 Movie Manners (July 19, 2008)
 Please and Thank You  (July 26, 2008)
 Birthday Manners (August 2, 2008)
 Library Manners (August 9, 2008)
 Get Well Manners (August 16, 2008)
 Classroom Manners (August 30, 2008)

Season 2 (2009)
 Babysitting Manners (August 22, 2009)
 Nature Park Manners (August 29, 2009)
 Museum Manners (September 5, 2009)
 Carnival Manners (September 12, 2009)
 Airport Manners (September 19, 2009)
 Elevator Manners (September 26, 2009)
 Family Meal Manners (October 3, 2009)
 Swimming Pool Manners (October 10, 2009)
 Supermarket Manners (October 17, 2009)
 TV Time Manners (October 24, 2009)

External links
 
 

2000s American animated television series
2008 American television series debuts
2009 American television series endings
2000s British animated television series
2008 British television series debuts
2009 British television series endings
2000s Canadian animated television series
2008 Canadian television series debuts
2009 Canadian television series endings
American flash animated television series
British flash animated television series
Canadian flash animated television series
American children's animated television series
American preschool education television series
British preschool education television series
Canadian preschool education television series
Animated preschool education television series
2000s preschool education television series
Disney Junior original programming
English-language television shows
Etiquette
Animated television series about children
Animated television series about reptiles and amphibians
Fictional crocodilians
Interstitial television shows
Television series by Disney